Bartol Gyurgieuvits (also Bartol Jurjevic or Gjurgjevic) (1506–1566) was a Croatian musicologist and lexicographer born in Turopolje near Zagreb.

As a musicologist
Gyurgieuvits was captured  by the Ottomans in the Battle of Mohács in 1526 and lived as a slave for 13 years before escaping. During this period he could learn and grasp the basics of Turkish music. Years later, in 1544 he published De Turcarum ritu et caeremoniis in Amsterdam which was one of the first European books to describe music in the Ottoman society of that day.

As a Lexicographer
Gyurgieuvits is also known to have written the first known Croatian-Latin dictionary in 1544. He is also the author of the practical Italian-Arabic-Hebrew-Aramaic dictionary. His works in the field were published in many languages.

See also
 Arabic music

References and notes
 Croatian Humanists, Ecumenists, Latinists, and Encyclopaedists

1506 births
1566 deaths
Linguists from Croatia
Croatian translators
Latin–Croatian translators
Croatian musicologists
Croatian lexicographers
Slaves from the Ottoman Empire
16th-century slaves